, formerly known as 
, is a convention center in Nara, Nara, Japan. Located near Kasuga Grand Shrine in Nara Park, the venue re-opened on July 1, 2015, annexing its adjacent public building that served as  that closed on December 31, 2014.

External links

Buildings and structures in Nara, Nara
Tourist attractions in Nara Prefecture
Music venues in Japan
Convention centers in Japan
Event venues established in 1989
1989 establishments in Japan